David Grimes (born 9 March 1948, in Salem, Massachusetts) is an American composer. In 1970 he graduated from the Berklee College of Music with a Bachelor of Music degree. He then entered the University of Toronto where he earned a Master of Music in 1972. In 1971, he co-founded the Canadian Electronic Ensemble (CEE) with David Jaeger, James Montgomery and Larry Lake. He performed internationally and made several recordings with the group over the next 15 years. In 1976 his composition Increscents won the CBC National Radio Competition for Young Composers. In 1986 he returned to the United States. He currently teaches on the faculty of Northeastern University.

References

1948 births
Living people
American male composers
21st-century American composers
Berklee College of Music alumni
University of Toronto alumni
Northeastern University faculty
21st-century American male musicians